Paul Braddon (1864–1937) was an English artist who predominantly painted landscape scenes in the watercolour medium. He was influenced by the work of Paul Marny.

Life and work

Paul Braddon was the pseudonym of James Leslie Crees. He was born at 46, Ledsam Street in Birmingham on 10 July 1864. In his early years he created architectural drawings of continental cathedrals and churches. Later he abandoned this style in favour of the watercolours for which he is best known. He made pencil sketches of buildings and scenes, carefully annotated, from which he produced the eventual watercolours. His output was prolific, as it needed to be in order for him to earn a living. For several years he painted exclusively for a London firm which sold many of his pictures in the United States. He died aged 73 on 24 July 1937 in Thornton Heath, Croydon, Surrey, and was buried on 24 July 1937 in Addington, Surrey..

Exhibitions and collections

Paul Braddon's work can be found in a number of museums and art galleries worldwide including Birmingham Museum and Art Gallery, Shrewsbury Museum, Edinburgh Museum and Art Gallery, Inverclyde Museum, Bronte Museum, and Blackburn Grammar School.

References

English artists
1864 births
1937 deaths